Controversies involving science exists in all aspects. Sometimes defined as a "persistent disagreement" over knowledge, the contrasting opinions of certain topics leaves individuals in a tense setting.

A scientific controversy is a substantial disagreement among scientists. A scientific controversy may involve issues such as the interpretation of data, which ideas are most supported by evidence, and which ideas are most worth pursuing.

Controversies between scientific and non-scientific ideas are not within the realm of science and are not true scientific controversies.

The origin of science-related controversies 
Scientific controversies usually exist in the context of geography, history, and social context. Much like other topics, there are individuals that can’t seem to see eye to eye within the world of science. Depending on the demographic, the way a community sides with an opinion varies. With the natural conflict of having varying opinions, an audience having their biases, and more, makes for controversy. Even more in a public setting, contrasting opinions encourage discourse amongst individuals.

Conflict with beliefs 
In the situation of even presenting clear and scientifically proven evidence, people will always have their own opinion. "Controversy can be rooted in differing beliefs and values; personal, political, social, and economic interests; fears; and moral and ethical considerations—all of which are central to decisions and typically subject to public debate".

As described above, individuals have their opinions based on various subjects such as culture, history, ethics, morals, religion, and more. This leads the stance on certain scientific topics to be very different across the board as perceptions vary from person to person, this is the ultimate reason why scientific controversy exists, to begin with. Science-related controversies all follow similar characteristics.

 Conflict over personal beliefs, values, and interests
 Public perception
 Voices behind opinions presented to the public

Nature of science-related controversies 
With science being inconclusive in itself, it leads to a disconnect between individuals. Oftentimes, science gets roped into personal morals and social values which leads to contrasting ideas. This arises the issue of communicating science in an appropriate manner. Listed below, there are some of the various examples of scientific controversies.

See also
History of the race and intelligence controversy
Biopsychiatry controversy
Causes of ADHD
List of scientific priority disputes
List of scientific controversies
Science
Scientific method

References

Philosophy of science